Murdock is a rural town in Swift County, Minnesota, United States. The population was 306 at the 2020 census. The city is part of the Kerhoven-Murdock-Sunburg (KMS) school district. Murdock has Kerkhoven-Murdock-Sunburg Elementary School which is for grades PreK-5.

History
A post office has been in operation at Murdock since 1878. Murdock was platted in 1881 by S. S. Murdock, and named for him. Murdock was incorporated in 1881.

In June 2020, a neo-pagan religion known as the Asatru Folk Assembly (AFA) purchased the Calvary Lutheran Church, a former Lutheran church in Murdock for use as a gathering place for AFA members of the Northern Great Plains.
On December 9, 2020, the Murdock City Council voted to allow the AFA conditional approval to use the former church. This caused uproar as the AFA has a policy of only allowing whites to become members of the religion, leading to accusations of racism against the AFA and against Murdock. More than 120,000 Minnesotans have signed a petition to stop the AFA's use of the former church.

Geography

U.S. Route 12 serves as a main route in the community.

Demographics

2010 census
As of the census of 2010, there were 278 people, 117 households, and 74 families living in the city. The racial makeup of the city was 95.0% White, 4.0% from other races, and 1.1% from two or more races. Hispanic or Latino of any race were 7.2% of the population.

There were 117 households, of which 32.5% had children under the age of 18 living with them, 47.9% were married couples living together, 9.4% had a female householder with no husband present, 6.0% had a male householder with no wife present, and 36.8% were non-families. 33.3% of all households were made up of individuals, and 12.8% had someone living alone who was 65 years of age or older. The average household size was 2.38 and the average family size was 3.07.

The median age in the city was 37.4 years. 27% of residents were under the age of 18; 7% were between the ages of 18 and 24; 27.8% were from 25 to 44; 28.1% were from 45 to 64; and 10.4% were 65 years of age or older. The gender makeup of the city was 48.2% male and 51.8% female.

2000 census
As of the census of 2000, there were 303 people, 126 households, and 77 families living in the city. The racial makeup of the city was 95.05% White, 0.66% African American, 3.96% from other races, and 0.33% from two or more races. Hispanic or Latino of any race were 8.25% of the population.

There were 126 households, out of which 32.5% had children under the age of 18 living with them, 49.2% were married couples living together, 11.1% had a female householder with no husband present, and 38.1% were non-families. 34.9% of all households were made up of individuals, and 17.5% had someone living alone who was 65 years of age or older. The average household size was 2.40 and the average family size was 3.15.

In the city, the population was spread out, with 30.0% under the age of 18, 7.9% from 18 to 24, 27.1% from 25 to 44, 14.5% from 45 to 64, and 20.5% who were 65 years of age or older.  The median age was 35 years. For every 100 females, there were 98.0 males. For every 100 females age 18 and over, there were 96.3 males.

The median income for a household in the city was $28,750, and the median income for a family was $40,000. Males had a median income of $25,781 versus $16,477 for females. The per capita income for the city was $17,011. About 8.3% of families and 7.4% of the population were below the poverty line, including 10.1% of those under the age of eighteen and 6.5% of those 65 or over.

Notable people
Andrew Falk - farmer and state legislator
David Frederickson - Commissioner of the Minnesota Department of Agriculture
Howard Wads Rundquist - businessman, teacher, and state legislator

References

Cities in Minnesota
Cities in Swift County, Minnesota
Populated places established in 1878
1878 establishments in Minnesota